Payton's Place is an album by the jazz trumpet player Nicholas Payton, released in 1998.

Track listing
All songs compositions by Nicholas Payton, except as indicated.

 Zigaboogaloo – 5:53
 The Three Trumpeteers – 5:26
 Back to the Source – 6:27
 A Touch of Silver – 5:12
 Concentric Circles – 7:08
 Li'l Duke's Strut – 5:06
 Time Traveling – 5:36
 With a Song in My Heart – 5:35 (Richard Rodgers, Lorenz Hart)
 Paraphernalia – 9:39 (Wayne Shorter)
 Brownie à la Mode – 4:17
 People Make the World Go Round – 5:21 (Thom Bell, Linda Creed)
 The Last Goodbye – 5:25 (Thom Bell, Linda Creed)

Personnel:
Nicholas Payton - trumpet
Tim Warfield - tenor saxophone
Anthony Wonsey - piano
Reuben Rogers - bass
Adonis Rose - drums

Special guests:
Wynton Marsalis - trumpet (#2,8)
Roy Hargrove - trumpet (#2,10)
Joshua Redman - tenor saxophone (#4)

Production Credits
 Producer: Nicholas Payton.
 Executive Producer: Richard Seidel
 Recorder, mixed, mastered by James Nichols.
 Production Coordinator: Camille Tominaro
 Production Assistant: Samantha Black
 Mastered at BMG Studios, New York.
 Additional musicians:
 Wynton Marsalis, trumpet: "The Three Trumpeteers" and "Brownie à la Mode".
 Roy Hargrove, trumpet: "The Three Trumpeteers" and "With A Song in My Heart".
 Joshua Redman, tenor saxophone: "A Touch of Silver".
 Management: The Management Ark, Princeton, NJ
 Art direction & Design – Giulio Tururro.
 Photographs – Barron Claiborne.
 Recording Session Photographs – Jiimy Katz
 Label: Polygram Records

Charts

References

1998 albums
Verve Records albums